David Maxim Triesman, Baron Triesman (born 30 October 1943) is a British politician, merchant banker and former trade union leader.

Triesman is a Labour member of the House of Lords. Triesman previously sat as a Labour peer until resigning the whip in July 2019, then  having previously been a minister in the Department for Innovation, Universities and Skills and Foreign and Commonwealth Office. He sat non-affiliated in the House of Lords until 2020 when he rejoined Labour. He was chairman of the Football Association from 2008 to 2010.

Background
Triesman (named Maxim after Maxim Gorky, the Russian author, whom his mother admired) was born into a North London Jewish community. He was the son of Michael Triesman, an advertising manager and wartime aircraft inspector of Belarusian and Latvian descent, and Rita Triesman (née Lubran) of French descent. His parents were active Communists.

Triesman was educated at the Stationers' Company's School in London, before going to the University of Essex and subsequently the University of Cambridge, King's College.

At Essex University, Triesman and a group of fellow students seized control declaring it a 'free university'. He was subsequently suspended from Essex in 1968 after interrupting a meeting addressed by a defence industry scientist but readmitted after two weeks.

He is a Senior Network Member at the European Leadership Network (ELN).

Business career
Triesman has been involved in business in real estate, banking, publishing and fine art. He has served on the boards and advisory boards of several companies including chairing Victoria Management, the advisory board of UBS and Templewood Merchant Bank and some of its subsidiaries. He is an executive board member of the Salamanca Group and its subsidiaries, One Ocean Enterprises, Funding Affordable Homes (and its Housing Association).

Politics and union career
In 1959, aged 16, Triesman became a member of the Labour Party but eleven years later resigned and joined the Communist Party where he remained for six years, following which he rejoined the Labour Party. He is an ex-Maoist.

For a number of years, he was a lecturer and research director at South Bank Polytechnic (now London South Bank University) and held roles in the lecturers' union, NATFHE. Triesman became a full-time union official of NATFHE in 1984, with the post of National Negotiating Secretary. He was also General Secretary of the Association of University Teachers from 1993 until 2001.

He then was appointed as the General Secretary of the Labour Party from 2001 to December 2003, where a significant part of his job was to maintain the support of the trade unions who had become disillusioned with Tony Blair's government.

He was created a Life Peer on 9 January 2004 taking the title Baron Triesman, of Tottenham in the London Borough of Haringey, prior to which he was elected a Visiting Fellow of Wolfson College, Cambridge in 2000, for the study of economics and Higher Education. He has published a number of academic papers in economics and epidemiology. He is a senior visiting fellow at the University of Warwick and a visiting fellow at the London School of Economics. Triesman is a Fellow of the Royal Statistical Society and the Royal Society of Arts. In 2015, he was awarded the Icebreaker Award by the Chinese Ambassador to the UK for services to Chinese-UK relations, including football.

He served as HM Opposition (Labour) Lords Shadow Spokesperson for Foreign and Commonwealth Affairs from 2010 to 2014.

Triesman is a member of the Henry Jackson Society's Political Council, and a member of the European Leadership Network Board and Top Level Group.

Triesman resigned from the Labour group in the House of Lords in July 2019 in protest at the party leadership's behaviour and policies with regard to antisemitism in the party, Brexit and defence.

He rejoined the Labour Party in February 2020.

Government office
Under Tony Blair's third Labour administration, Triesman served as Parliamentary Under-Secretary in the Foreign and Commonwealth Office with responsibility for relations with Africa, Latin America, the Caribbean, Overseas Territories, the Commonwealth, UK visas, migration policy working directly to the prime minister, consular policy, the British Council, the BBC World Service and the Chevening Scholarships Scheme. During this period, he conducted negotiations with Iran to secure the release of a group of British naval and marine personnel who had been taken prisoner in the Upper Persian Gulf. In the reshuffle of 29 June 2007, he was moved to the newly created post of Parliamentary Under-Secretary of the Department for Innovation, Universities and Skills. In this role, he had responsibility for quality in higher education, innovation and intellectual property and future planning. In 2004, he was appointed as a Lord in Waiting. He is a member of the European Affairs External Affairs Select Committee. He is chairman of the Design Commission. He is co-chairman of the All Party St Lucia Group and a member of the All Party China and Chinese in Britain Group.

Football administration
A longtime fan of Tottenham Hotspur and patron of the club's charitable Foundation, Triesman became the first independent Chairman of the Football Association in January 2008. He resigned in May 2010. Triesman was a board member at Wembley National Stadium, the Premier League shareholders' meeting, the Football Foundation, and is a qualified senior football referee.

In February 2011 he testified before a parliamentary committee on the state of the administration of English football. He was heavily critical of the FA, saying it was shying away from governing the game. He was especially damning of the FA's administrative procedures and its working relationship with other football bodies, in particular the Premier League.

Comments about FIFA bribery allegations
On 16 May 2010, the Mail on Sunday revealed Lord Triesman made comments about alleged bribery attempts by Spain and Russia of referees in the 2010 FIFA World Cup. Triesman asserted, "there’s some evidence that the Spanish football authorities are trying to identify the referees ... and pay them." It was announced that he was to 'quit' both the FA and England's 2018 bid.
On 10 May 2011, Triesman, speaking before a British parliamentary select committee, affirmed his suspicions of bribery concerning four FIFA members, claiming that they sought bribes in return for backing England's failed 2018 World Cup bid. Whilst the FIFA Executive Committee dismissed the allegations, all the FIFA officials named have subsequently been either convicted of offences, or face extradition to the US for trial. They with other FIFA executives have been banned for different periods from all contact with football.

Personal life
Triesman spent many years in a relationship with the writer and critic Michelene Wandor until they split up in the late 1990s. He married Lucy Hooberman in 2004 and has an adopted daughter.

See also
List of Jews in sports (non-players)

References

External links
 Debrett's People of Today
 Lord Triesman - Parliamentary biography

1943 births
Living people
People from Hitchin
Politicians from London
English Jews
Jewish British politicians
English people of French descent
English people of Belarusian-Jewish descent
People educated at the Stationers' Company's School
Communist Party of Great Britain members
Labour Party (UK) Baronesses- and Lords-in-Waiting
British trade union leaders
Labour Party (UK) life peers
Alumni of the University of Essex
Alumni of King's College, Cambridge
Fellows of Wolfson College, Cambridge
Chairmen of the Football Association
Life peers created by Elizabeth II